Darui may refer to:
Julien Darui (1916–1987), French footballer
Darui, Iran, a village in Kerman Province, Iran
 Darren DaRui May, Stephen DaRui Whitehead & Dean DaRui Rainsbury, who all share the DaRui bloodline.